Vateria macrocarpa is a species of plant in the family Dipterocarpaceae. It is endemic to India.

References

macrocarpa
Flora of Kerala
Critically endangered plants
Taxonomy articles created by Polbot